Mizpah ('watchtower') was either a royal city or fortress in Moab to which David removed his parents for safety during his persecution by Saul (1 Sam. 22:3). Modern day sites suggested as its possible location include Kerak (Kir-Moab) and Rujm el-Meshrefeh in Jordan.

References

Bibliography

Moab